MADO is a Turkish ice cream and pastry brand that has about 300 outlets in Turkey and 22 other countries around the world. The brand gets its name from two words: "Maraş", the former name of the city where the firm is originated; and "Dondurma", the Turkish sort of ice-cream.

History 
MADO was founded in 1850 by Yaşar Kanbur. The ice cream shop became a chain after 1991. It has more than 305 restaurants and cafes in Turkey, and also has branches in Australia, Canada, Netherlands, United Arab Emirates, Lebanon, South Korea, Cyprus, China, Taiwan, Qatar, Kuwait, Saudi Arabia, Bahrain, Malaysia, Azerbaijan, Kazakhstan, Turkmenistan, Iraq, Greece, Georgia, Germany, Jordan and Oman.

In 2019, MADO opened its first shop in Taiwan in a joint venture with the Taiwanese conglomerate Teco Group.

References 

Ice cream brands
Food and drink companies of Turkey
Ice cream parlors